Patrick Sandström (born 7 October 1970) is a retired Swedish football striker.

References

1970 births
Living people
Swedish footballers
Umeå FC players
IFK Norrköping players
Örgryte IS players
Association football forwards
Allsvenskan players